This is a list of public holidays in Saint Helena, Ascension and Tristan da Cunha, a British overseas territory in the South Atlantic Ocean consisting of Saint Helena, Ascension Island and Tristan da Cunha.

Local custom and variance
Saint Helena has a total of 9 public holidays, Ascension Island a total of 10 days, and Tristan da Cunha a total of 11 days.

St. Helena's feast day is celebrated as the island of Saint Helena was discovered on the feast day and is named in her honour; it is a public holiday on St Helena only. Ascension Island was discovered on Ascension Day in 1503; it is celebrated on that island and also in Tristan da Cunha. In the archipelago of Tristan da Cunha, Anniversary Day celebrates the day on which the islands were formally annexed to the British Empire in 1816.

Ratting Day is a local observance on Tristan da Cunha island and its date is declared annually by the Chief Islander; it can be moved at short notice depending on weather conditions.

Christian observance
The territory has a largely Christian population and two further dates are therefore locally notable in the calendar: Easter Sunday and Whit Sunday (the Pentecost), both of which (along with their associated public holidays of Good Friday, Easter Monday, Ascension Day and Whit Monday) vary each year.

See also

Public holidays in the United Kingdom
Bank holiday

External links
Saint Helena Public Holidays 2011

References

Saint Helena, Ascension and Tristan da Cunha
Society of Saint Helena, Ascension and Tristan da Cunha
Saint Helena, Ascension and Tristan da Cunha
Saint Helena, Ascension and Tristan da Cunha